Bedrock (also known as John Digweed & Nick Muir) are a British electronic dance music duo comprising John Digweed and Nick Muir.

Biography
They produced the singles "For What You Dream Of" (1993, featured in Trainspotting), "Set in Stone" / "Forbidden Zone" (1997), "Heaven Scent" (1999) (featured in the film Groove) and "Voices" (2000), all of which reached the UK Singles Chart. More recently they released the Beautiful Strange EP in 2001, "Emerald" in 2002, "Forge" in 2003 and "Santiago" in 2005.

They have also remixed the work of artists such as Humate, New Order, Way Out West, Evolution, Satoshi Tomiie, the Orb and Underworld. In 1999, the duo founded Bedrock Records. In 2003, they composed the soundtrack of the MTV cartoon drama Spider-Man, a miscellaneous program tied into the 2002 blockbuster film as a promotion.

The song "Beautiful Strange" featured in the 2004 film What the Bleep Do We Know!?.

Discography

Studio albums

Extended plays

Singles

As John Digweed & Nick Muir

References

External links

Official website

English electronic music duos
British trance music groups
Electronic dance music duos
Male musical duos
Musical groups from London